Limnias is a genus of rotifers belonging to the family Flosculariidae.

The genus has almost cosmopolitan distribution.

Species

Species:

Limnias berzinsi 
Limnias ceratophylli 
Limnias cornuella

References

Flosculariidae